The federal government of the United States empowers a wide range of federal law enforcement agencies called the "Feds" to maintain law and public order related to matters affecting the country as a whole.

While the majority of federal law enforcement employees work for the Departments of Justice and Homeland Security, there are dozens of other federal law enforcement agencies under the other executive departments, as well as under the legislative and judicial branches of the federal government.

Federal agencies employ approximately 137,000 full-time personnel authorized to make arrests and/or carry firearms in the 50 states and the District of Columbia, out of the more than 800,000 law enforcement officers in the United States.

Overview

Federal law enforcement in the United States is more than two hundred years old. For example, the Postal Inspection Service can trace its origins back to 1772, while the U.S. Marshals Service dates to 1789. Other agencies, such as the FBI, are relatively recent, being founded in the early twentieth century. Other agencies have been reformed, such as the ATF which was started only in 1972, but had its origins in 1886. Some federal law enforcement agencies have been formed after mergers of other agencies, over the years. This includes the CBP and the ATF.

Military law enforcement, although federal, consists of both active duty and civilian officers, with "DOD Police" referring to any civilian engaged in police duties for the DOD or the US Armed Forces. 

Different federal law enforcement authorities have authority under different parts of the United States Code (U.S.C.). Most are limited by the U.S. Code to investigating matters that are explicitly within the power of the federal government. There are exceptions, with some agencies and officials enforcing codes of U.S. states and tribes of Native Americans in the United States.  Some federal investigative powers have become broader in practice, especially since the passage of the USA PATRIOT Act in October 2001.

The United States Department of Justice was formerly the largest and is still the most prominent, collection of federal law enforcement agencies. It has handled most law enforcement duties at the federal level and includes the United States Marshals Service (USMS), the Federal Bureau of Investigation (FBI), the Drug Enforcement Administration (DEA), the Bureau of Alcohol, Tobacco, Firearms and Explosives (ATF), Federal Bureau of Prisons (BOP), and others.

However, the United States Department of Homeland Security (DHS) became the department with the most sworn armed Federal law enforcement officers and agents upon its creation in 2002 in response to the September 11, 2001 terrorist attacks when it incorporated agencies seen as having roles in protecting the country against terrorism. This included large agencies such as U.S. Immigration and Customs Enforcement Homeland Security Investigations (HSI), the U.S. Secret Service (USSS), the U.S. Coast Guard (USCG), the Transportation Security Administration (TSA), and the U.S. Customs and Border Protection (CBP) (created by combining the former agencies of the United States Border Patrol, United States Customs Service, and the United States Department of Agriculture's Animal and Plant Health Inspection Service (APHIS) into a single agency within the DHS).

Statistics

 In 2020, federal agencies employed approximately 137,000 full-time personnel authorized to make arrests and/or carry firearms in the 50 states and the District of Columbia. Around half (49%) of the personnel worked for the Department of Homeland Security, and 30% worked for the Department of Justice.
 Federal officers' most common primary function was criminal investigation or enforcement (68%), corrections (25%), and police response and patrol (9%).
 Around 15% of federal law enforcement officers and 13% of supervisory law enforcement personnel were female in 2020.
 More than a third (38%) of federal officers were members of a racial or ethnic minority in 2020. This included 21% who were Hispanic or Latino, and 10% who were black or African American. In 2002, racial or ethnic minorities officers constituted 32.4% of federal officers.
 About 60% of federal agencies authorized shotguns or manual rifles for officers while on duty in 2020. Fifty percent authorized semiautomatic rifles and 20% authorized fully automatic rifles for officers while on duty.

List of agencies and units of agencies
Agencies in bold text are law enforcement agencies (LEAs).

Executive Branch

Department of Agriculture

 Office of the Secretary of Agriculture
 Protective Operations Division (POD)
 Office of Inspector General (USDA-OIG)
 United States Forest Service (USFS) 
 U.S. Forest Service Law Enforcement & Investigations (USFS LEI)

Department of Commerce

 Office of Inspector General (DOC-OIG)
Office of Security (DOC OS) 
US Commerce Department Police
 Bureau of Industry and Security (BIS) 
 Office of Export Enforcement (OEE)
 National Institute of Standards and Technology (NIST) 
 National Institute of Standards and Technology Police
 National Oceanic and Atmospheric Administration (NOAA) 
 National Marine Fisheries Service (NMFS) 
 Office of Law Enforcement (OLE)

Department of Defense

 Office of Inspector General (DOD-OIG)
Defense Criminal Investigative Service (DCIS)
 Pentagon Force Protection Agency (PFPA) 
 United States Pentagon Police (USPPD)
 Department of Defense Police (DOD Police)  
 Defense Logistics Agency (DLA) 
 Defense Logistics Agency Police National Security Agency (NSA) 
 National Security Agency Police Defense Intelligence Agency (DIA) 
 Defense Intelligence Agency Police National Geospatial-Intelligence Agency (NGA) 
 National Geospatial-Intelligence Agency Police Department of the Army United States Army Criminal Investigation Division (USACID) 
 United States Army Counterintelligence (ACI) 
 United States Army Military Police Corps (USAMPC) Department of the Army Civilian Police (DACP) 
 includes Department of the Army Civilian Guards (DASG) United States Army Corrections Command (USACC)
 Department of the Navy 
 Naval Criminal Investigative Service (NCIS) 
 United States Marine Corps Criminal Investigation Division (USMC CID) 
 United States Navy Master-at-Arms (military police)
 Department of the Navy Police (civilian police)
 United States Marine Corps Military Police United States Marine Corps Civilian Police Department of the Air Force 
 Department of the Air Force Office of Special Investigations (OSI) 
 Air Force Security Forces Center (AFSFC) 
 United States Air Force Security Forces (military police)
 Department of the Air Force Police (civilian police) 
 includes Department of Air Force Civilian Guards (DAF Guard)

Department of Education

 Office of Inspector General (ED-OIG)
 Protective Service Division  (ED-PSD)
 Office for Civil Rights (OCR)

Department of Energy

 Office of Inspector General (DOE-OIG)
 Office of Health, Safety and Security (DOE-HSS)
 National Nuclear Security Administration (NNSA) 
 Office of Secure Transportation (OST) Federal Protective ForcesDepartment of Health and Human Services

 Office of Inspector General (HHS-OIG) 
 United States Food and Drug Administration (HHSFDA) 
 Office of Criminal Investigations (OCI)
 National Institutes of Health (NIH) 
 National Institutes of Health PoliceDepartment of Homeland Security

 Office of Inspector General (DHS-OIG)
 Federal Protective Service (FPS) 
 Federal Law Enforcement Training Centers (FLETC) Office of the Chief Security Officer (OCSO)
 United States Coast Guard (USCG) Coast Guard Investigative Service (CGIS) 
 United States Coast Guard Police (CGPD)
 United States Customs and Border Protection (CBP) 
 United States Border Patrol (USBP) 
 CBP Air and Marine Operations (AMO) 
 CBP Office of Field Operations (OFO) 
 Federal Emergency Management Agency (FEMA)
 Mount Weather Emergency Operations CenterMount Weather Emergency Operations Center Police Office of Chief Security Officer (OCSO)
 United States Immigration and Customs Enforcement (ICE) 
 Homeland Security Investigations (HSI) 
 Enforcement Removal Operations (ERO) 
 Office of Intelligence Office of Professional Responsibility (OPR)
 United States Secret Service (USSS) 
 United States Secret Service Uniformed Division (USSS UD) 
 Transportation Security Administration (TSA) 
 Office of Law Enforcement (OLE)/Federal Air Marshal Service (FAMS) 
 Federal Flight Deck Officer (FFDO)
 Office of Inspection (OI)
 United States Citizenship and Immigration Services (USCIS) 
 Fraud Detection and National Security Directorate (FDNS)

Department of Housing and Urban Development

 Office of Inspector General (HUD-OIG)
 Protective Service Division (HUD-PSD)

Department of the Interior

 Office of Inspector General (DOI-OIG)
 Bureau of Indian Affairs (BIA)
Office of Justice Services
 Bureau of Indian Affairs Police Bureau of Land Management (BLM) 
 Office of Law Enforcement United States Bureau of Reclamation (BOR) 
 Bureau of Reclamation Security Response Force (SRF) formerly known as (Hoover Dam Police), that covers Hoover Dam, Grand Coulee Dam and Glen Canyon Dam
 National Park Service (NPS) U.S. Park Ranger United States Park Police 
 Office of Surface Mining Reclamation and Enforcement (OSMRE)
 United States Fish and Wildlife Service (USFWS) 
 Office of Law Enforcement (FWS OLE)
 Division of Refuge Law EnforcementDepartment of Justice

 Office of the Inspector General (DOJ-OIG) 
 Bureau of Alcohol, Tobacco, Firearms and Explosives (ATF) 
 Drug Enforcement Administration (DEA) 
 Federal Bureau of Investigation (FBI) 
 FBI Police 
 FBI Academy Federal Bureau of Prisons (BOP) 
 United States Marshals Service (USMS) 
 Office of Professional Responsibility (DOJ OPR)

Department of Labor

 Office of Inspector General (DOL-OIG)

Department of State

 Office of Inspector General (DOS-OIG) 
 Bureau of Diplomatic Security (DS) 
 Diplomatic Security Service (DSS)

Department of Transportation

 Office of Inspector General (DOT-OIG) 
 United States Merchant Marine Academy 
 Department of Public Safety (USMMADPS) National Highway Traffic Safety Administration 
 Office of Odometer Fraud Investigation (OFI)

Department of the Treasury

 Office of Inspector General (USDT-OIG)
 Bureau of Engraving and Printing 
 Bureau of Engraving and Printing Police Financial Crimes Enforcement Network (FINCEN) 
 Internal Revenue Service (IRS) 
 Criminal Investigation (IRS-CI) 
 United States Mint Police (USMP) 
 Treasury Inspector General for Tax Administration (TIGTA)
 Special Inspector General for Pandemic Recovery (SIGPR) 
 Special Inspector General for the Troubled Asset Relief Program (SIGTARP)

Department of Veterans Affairs

 Office of Inspector General (VA-OIG)
 Veterans Affairs PoliceLegislative Branch

 Sergeant at Arms of the United States House of Representatives 
 Sergeant at Arms of the United States Senate 
 United States Capitol Police (USCP) 
 Office of Inspector General (USCP OIG)
 Office of Professional Responsibility (USCP OPR)
 Library of Congress (LOC) 
 Office of Inspector General (LOC-OIG)
 Government Publishing Office (GPO) 
 Office of Inspector General (GPO-OIG)
 Government Publishing Office PoliceJudicial Branch
 Marshal of the United States Supreme Court United States Supreme Court Police 
 Administrative Office of the United States Courts (AOUSC) 
 Office of Probation and Pretrial Services (Federal Probation Officers)Other federal law enforcement agencies
Independent Agencies and federally-administered institutions;
 Central Intelligence Agency 
 Security Protective Service (CIA SPS)
 United States Environmental Protection Agency Office of Inspector General (EPA-OIG)
 Office of Enforcement and Compliance Assurance (OECA)Criminal Investigation Division National Gallery of Art 
 Office of Protection Services NASA 
 Office of Inspector General (NASA-OIG) 
 Office of Protective Services (NASA OPS)
 United States Office of Personnel Management (OPM) 
 Office of Inspector General (OPM OIG)

 United States Postal Service (USPS)
 Office of Inspector General (USPS-OIG) 
 United States Postal Inspection Service (USPIS)  U.S. Postal Police 
 Smithsonian Institution (SI) Office of Inspector General (SI-OIG)
 Office of Protection Services 
 National Zoological Park Police (NZPP) 
 Amtrak 
 Office of Inspector General (Amtrak-OIG)
 Office of Security Strategy and Special Operations (OSSSO)
 Amtrak Police Department 
Federal Reserve System Office of Inspector General (FRB/CFPB-OIG) 
 Federal Reserve Police 
Federal Reserve Board of Governors
 Federal Reserve Board Police 
 Tennessee Valley Authority 
 Office of Inspector General (TVA-OIG)
 Tennessee Valley Authority Police (TVAP) 
 Nuclear Regulatory Commission (NRC)
 Office of Inspector General (NRC-OIG)
 National Science Foundation (NSF)
 Office of Inspector General (NSF-OIG)
 National Archives and Records Administration (NARA)
 Office of Inspector General (NARA-OIG)
 Peace Corps (PC)
 Office of Inspector General (PC-OIG)
 Railroad Retirement Board (RRB)
 Office of Inspector General (RRB-OIG)
 Small Business Administration (SBA)
 Office of Inspector General (SBA-OIG)
 Federal Deposit Insurance Corporation (FDIC)
 Office of Inspector General (FDIC-OIG)
 General Services Administration (GSA)
 Office of Inspector General (GSA-OIG)
 Social Security Administration (SSA)
 Office of Inspector General (SSA-OIG)
 United States Agency for International Development
 Office of Inspector General (AID-OIG)
 Corporation for National and Community Service (CNCS)
 Office of Inspector General (CNCS-OIG''')

List of former agencies and units of agencies
 Bureau of Internal Revenue, Narcotic Division (1921-1927) (transferred to Bureau of Prohibition)
 Bureau of Prohibition, Narcotic Division (1927-1930) (merged into Federal Bureau of Narcotics)
 Federal Narcotics Control Board (FNCB) (1922-1930) (merged into Federal Bureau of Narcotics)
 White House Police Force (1922-1930) (became part of the United States Secret Service. It was renamed the Executive Protective Service in 1970 and then the Uniformed Division of the Secret Service in 1977)
 Steamboat Inspection Service (1871-1932) (merged into Bureau of Marine Inspection and Navigation)
 Bureau of Marine Inspection and Navigation (1884-1946) (functions split between U.S. Customs Service and U.S. Coast Guard)
 Federal Bureau of Narcotics (FBN) (1930-1968) (merged into Bureau of Narcotics and Dangerous Drugs)
 Bureau of Drug Abuse Control (1966-1968) (merged into Bureau of Narcotics and Dangerous Drugs)
 Bureau of Narcotics and Dangerous Drugs (BNDD) (1968-1973) (merged into Drug Enforcement Administration)
 Office of Drug Abuse Law Enforcement (ODALE) (1972-1973) (merged into Drug Enforcement Administration)
 Office of National Narcotics Intelligence (ONNI) (1972-1973) (merged into Drug Enforcement Administration)
 Bureau of Secret Intelligence (BSI) (1916-1985) (replaced by Diplomatic Security Service)
 United States Treasury Police (TPF) (1879-1986) (merged with the Uniformed Division of the Secret Service)
 United States Customs Service (1789-2003) (functions split between U.S. Customs and Border Protection and U.S. Immigration and Customs Enforcement)
 Immigration and Naturalization Service (INS) (1940-2003) (functions transferred to three new entities – U.S. Citizenship and Immigration Services, U.S. Immigration and Customs Enforcement, and U.S. Customs and Border Protection.)
 Library of Congress Police (LCP) (1950-2009) (merged into the United States Capitol Police)
 Hoover Dam Police (1931-2017) Merged with the Department of Interior
 Federal Investigative Services Division (replaced by National Background Investigations Bureau in 2016)
 National Background Investigations Bureau (2016-2019) (merged with Defense Counterintelligence and Security Agency)
 Defense Investigative Service (DSS) (1972-1999) (changed to Defense Security Service)
 Defense Security Service (DSS) (1999-2019) (merged with Defense Counterintelligence and Security Agency)

See also

 Federal Special Agents

 Law enforcement in the United States

 List of United States state and local law enforcement agencies

 Office of Inspector General (United States)

References

External links

 
 
Lists of government agencies in the United States
United States

fr:Police aux États-Unis#État fédéral